Noh Jin-Kyu (Hangul: 노진규, Hanja: 盧珍圭, 20 July 1992 – 3 April 2016) was a South Korean short track speed skater. During his first season at the senior level at the age of 18, he became the 2011 Overall World Champion. He was the World Record holder for 1500m and 3000m and team member for the 5000m Relay WR.

Career
Noh won the 2010 Junior World Championships, and due to the format of the South Korean National Team selection rules, he was able to win a spot on the team with his speediness on the ice for the 2010-2011 season despite his inexperience compared to veterans of the sport.  He quieted critics of his placement on the team by performing well at the 2011 Asian Winter Games, but struggled against experienced skaters at international events during the 2010–11 ISU Short Track Speed Skating World Cup, where technical aspects such as positioning skills are considered essential.

Overcoming his performances during the World Cup season, he dominated at the 2011 World Short Track Speed Skating Championships, winning gold in every race except the 500 m, where he did not qualify for the quarterfinals.  He won the overall World Championship in his first season on the senior level. In the following week, Noh helped Korea to win 2011 World Team Championships (last one to be scheduled into foreseeable future) in Warsaw, setting a new world record in 3000m in the process.

He discovered a benign tumor in his left shoulder in September 2013 and upon further inspection, it was discovered that he had a five-inch malignant tumor in his shoulder. He delayed surgery to allow him to compete at the 2014 Winter Olympics in Sochi. He would have competed in the Olympics, but was ruled out due to a broken elbow. He died on 3 April 2016 from cancer.

Personal life 
His sister is speed skater Noh Seon-yeong.

References

External links
 

1992 births
2016 deaths
South Korean male short track speed skaters
Asian Games medalists in short track speed skating
Asian Games gold medalists for South Korea
Short track speed skaters at the 2011 Asian Winter Games
Medalists at the 2011 Asian Winter Games
Universiade medalists in short track speed skating
World Short Track Speed Skating Championships medalists
Deaths from cancer in South Korea
Universiade gold medalists for South Korea
Competitors at the 2013 Winter Universiade
South Korean Buddhists
21st-century South Korean people